Sträck ut din hand ("Stretch Out Your Hand") is a 1995 album by Lasse Berghagen.

Songs
1.Sträck ut din hand ("Stretch Out Your Hand")
2.Låt oss rigga en skuta ("Let's Rig a Boat")
3.Då är du aldrig ensam ("Then You're Never Alone")
4.Till Bohuslän ("Towards Bohuslän")
5.Låt mej få ge dej min sång ("Let Me Give You My Song")
6.I mina blommiga sandaler ("In My Floral Sandals")
7.Nils
8.Stockholm i mitt hjärta ("Stockholm In My Heart")
9.En morgon av lycka ("A Morning of Luck")
10.Stäng inte dörr'n ("Don't Close the Door")
11.Res med mej uppför floden ("Travel With Me Up the River")
12.Farväl till sommaren ("Farewell To the Summer")
13.Du vandrar som oftast allena ("You Walk as Often Alone")

Charts

References

External links 

 

1995 albums
Lasse Berghagen albums